Walkington is a village and civil parish in the East Riding of Yorkshire, England.

The civil parish is formed by the village of Walkington and the hamlet of Broadgate. According to the 2011 UK census, Walkington parish had a population of 2,337, a reduction on the 2001 UK census figure of 2,481.

To the east of the village is Broadgate, the site of a former mental hospital, named Broadgate Hospital.

Another part of the former Broadgate Farm estate has been developed into a complex of holiday cottages named Broadgate Farm Cottages.

The village has three public houses located along the main road, East End, the Barrel, the Ferguson Fawsitt Arms, and the Dog and Duck. Ferguson closed its doors on 4 October 2020 due to the coronavirus pandemic, although it reopened under new owners in early 2022. In the centre of Walkington is the village pond.

The village school, Walkington Primary School is situated in Crake Wells, a minor street in the East End of the village. Before the year 1999 the school was divided between two sites which included the original school house at Northgate which dates back to the late 19th century. Before this, the street was called "School Lane". However, after a costly extension to the Crake Wells building, the infant and junior sections were joined together in 1999. The new building was officially opened by then Education Secretary David Blunkett, in October that year.

The parish church of All Hallows is a Grade II* listed building. A Methodist church is situated next to West End.

Ancient history
A few miles west of Walkington is the Bronze Age barrow complex of Walkington Wold. The remains there include the Walkington Wold Burials, the decapitated remains of Anglo-Saxon criminals.

To the east of the village is one of the medieval stone boundary markers for the sanctuary of Saint John of Beverley that is now a Scheduled Ancient Monument.

The Walkington Hoard, and other coins of the Corieltauvi tribe were discovered in large numbers between 2001 and 2008. They are now at the Yorkshire Museum.

References

External links

Walkington Parish Council
Walkington Village News
Walkington Primary School
Walkington Playing Field Association
Walkington Blog

Villages in the East Riding of Yorkshire
Civil parishes in the East Riding of Yorkshire